Bo language can refer to:

Bo language (Laos) (Maleng)
Bo language (India) (Aka-Bo)
Bo language (New Guinea)
Bo language (Mali) (Bomu)
Bankon language (Cameroon), also known as Bo language
Barkul language (Nigeria), also known as Bo-Rukul